Joe Cunningham (1931 - 21 August 2012) was a Gaelic footballer who played as a right wing-forward at club level for Armagh Harps, at inter-county level for the Armagh county team and at inter-provincial level for Ulster.

References

1931 births
2012 deaths
Armagh Harps Gaelic footballers
Armagh inter-county Gaelic footballers
Ulster inter-provincial Gaelic footballers